Gephyromantis boulengeri, sometimes known as Boulenger's Madagascar frog, is a species of frog in the family Mantellidae. It is endemic to Madagascar and found in the northeastern and eastern Madagascar as well as in Île Sainte-Marie. It is a common frog, although it is suspected to be in decline because of habitat loss and deterioration. However, it occurs in several protected areas.

References

boulengeri
Endemic frogs of Madagascar
Amphibians described in 1920
Taxa named by Paul Ayshford Methuen
Taxonomy articles created by Polbot